Nikolaos Moraitis (born 29 August 1957), is a Greek politician. He has served as a member of the Hellenic Parliament since 2008, representing Aitolo-Akarnania for the Communist Party of Greece

Background
Moraitis is a construction worker by profession. He is the Vice-Chair of the Federation of Farmers’ Association of Aitoloakarnania

References 

1957 births
Living people
People from Aktio-Vonitsa
Communist Party of Greece politicians
Greek MPs 2007–2009
Greek MPs 2009–2012
Greek MPs 2012 (May)
Greek MPs 2012–2014
Greek MPs 2015 (February–August)
Greek MPs 2015–2019